Roberts County is a county located in the U.S. state of Texas. As of the 2020 census, its population was 827, making it the eighth-least populous county in Texas. Its county seat is Miami, which is also the county's only incorporated community. The county was created in 1876 and organized in 1889. It is named for Oran Milo Roberts, a governor of Texas. Roberts County is one of five prohibition (entirely dry) counties in the state of Texas.

History

The Plains Apache inhabited the Texas Panhandle until they were displaced by the Comanche who dominated the area until the 1870s.  The Comanche hunted the large herds of buffalo, which grazed on the prairie.  In the Red River War of 1874–75, United States Army troops led by Ranald S. Mackenzie drove out the Comanches. Simultaneously, buffalo hunters killed the large herds in the area, destroying the food supply and livelihood of the Plains tribes, making way for permanent settlement by Anglo-Americans.

In 1876, Roberts County was carved from Bexar County and the Clay Land District. In 1887, the Southern Kansas Railway was built through Roberts County, and settlers followed.

Roberts County is the scene of a recent battle for water rights, where the City of Amarillo, Texas, the Canadian River Municipal Water Authority, and T. Boone Pickens have sought to purchase the water rights within the county. Between the three, they own 80% of the water rights.

Geography

The county is relatively flat except for the Canadian River valley.  Most of the land is used for cattle ranching.  The county  contains the  Mesa Vista Ranch, which seeks to protect quail, dove, and pheasant habitat along the creek beds south of the Canadian River.

Major highways
  U.S. Highway 60
  State Highway 70

Adjacent counties
 Ochiltree County (north)
 Hemphill County (east)
 Gray County (south)
 Carson County (southwest)
 Hutchinson County (west)
 Hansford County (northwest)
 Wheeler County (southeast)

Demographics

Note: the US Census treats Hispanic/Latino as an ethnic category. This table excludes Latinos from the racial categories and assigns them to a separate category. Hispanics/Latinos can be of any race.

As of the census of 2000,  887 people, 362 households, and 275 families were residing in the county.  The population density was less than 1/km2 (1/sq mi).  The  449 housing units averaged less than 1 per sq mi (0/km2).  The racial makeup of the county was 96.51% White, 0.34% African American, 0.56% Native American, 0.11% Asian, 1.35% from other races, and 1.13% from two or more races.  About 3.16% of the population was Hispanic or Latino of any race. 

Of the 362 households,  31.8% had children under  18 living with them, 70.7% were married couples living together, 3.9% had a female householder with no husband present, and 24.0% were not families. About 23.8% of all households were made up of individuals, and 10.8% had someone living alone who was 65  or older.  The average household size was 2.45, and the average family size was 2.88.

In the county, the age distribution was 25.0% under 18, 4.8% from 18 to 24, 24.8% from 25 to 44, 30.9% from 45 to 64, and 14.4% who were 65  or older.  The median age was 42 years. For every 100 females, there were 100.20 males.  For every 100 females age 18 and over, there were 97.30 males.

The median income for a household in the county was $44,792, and for a family was $50,400. Males had a median income of $33,125 versus $23,611 for females. The per capita income for the county was $20,923.  About 5.00% of families and 7.20% of the population were below the poverty line, including 7.50% of those under age 18 and 5.50% of those age 65 or over.

The largest self-reported ancestry groups in Roberts County, Texas are:

 23.7% English 

 18.4% German 

 15.2% Irish

 8.8% American

 2.0% Scots-Irish

 1.0% Polish

 1.0% Russian

 0.9% Czech

 0.9% Welsh

 0.7% Dutch

 0.5% French

Government and politics
Roberts County was one of the earliest counties in Texas to turn Republican. The last Democrat to win the county in a presidential election was Harry S. Truman in 1948, when he carried nearly 76% of its ballots. No Democrat has since exceeded the 40% of the vote that Texas native Lyndon B. Johnson won in the county in his 1964 national landslide. Jimmy Carter in 1976 was the last Democrat to win even 30% of the county's vote, Bill Clinton in 1996 to win 20%, and Al Gore in 2000 to win just 10%.

In recent years, Roberts County has become almost unanimously Republican. In 2008, 92% of voters voted for Republican John McCain versus only 7.92% for Democrat Barack Obama, making it one of the most Republican counties in the United States. In the 2016 presidential election, Republican Donald Trump received 94.58% of the vote, the largest margin in a county for a Republican in the U.S. that election. Roberts was again Trump's strongest county in 2020, and he won it by an even stronger margin: 96.2%-3.1%.

The county is governed by an elected county judge and four commissioners (each elected by a precinct within the county).

Communities
 Miami (county seat)
 Wayside

See also

 Dry counties
 List of museums in the Texas Panhandle
 National Register of Historic Places listings in Roberts County, Texas
 Recorded Texas Historic Landmarks in Roberts County

References

External links
 Roberts County government’s website
 
 Roberts County Profile from the Texas Association of Counties

 
1889 establishments in Texas
Pampa, Texas micropolitan area
Texas Panhandle
Populated places established in 1889